Richard Darnell (born January 1, 1953) is a retired professional basketball center who spent one season in the American Basketball Association (ABA) with the Virginia Squires during the 1975–76 season. He completed his collegiate career at San Jose State University, after two seasons (1970–71, 1971–72) at Cypress College and one season (1972–73) at Indiana State.

He averaged 17.5 points and 12.8 rebounds during his career at Cypress; he remains tied for ninth in career rebounds for the Chargers.  He averaged 9.7 points and 8.1 rebounds during his one season at Indiana State & 10.2 points and 8.1 rebounds during his season at San Jose State.

Rick Darnell currently coaches basketball to underprivileged children in South Los Angeles.

External links

Rick Darnell on legendsofbasketball.com

References 

1953 births
Living people
American expatriate basketball people in Italy
American men's basketball players
Centers (basketball)
Cypress Chargers men's basketball players
Indiana State Sycamores men's basketball players
Reyer Venezia players
San Jose State Spartans men's basketball players
Basketball players from Anaheim, California
Virginia Squires players